The Calling is the third studio album by Australian hip hop group Hilltop Hoods and was released on 22 September 2003 through Obese Records. The success of the album was significant in the Australian hip-hop scene because it demonstrated popular recognition for a genre previously supported by a comparatively small, "underground" fan base.

Three singles were released as single and two placed in the 2003 Triple J Hottest 100 chart: "The Nosebleed Section" was voted into ninth place, while "Dumb Enough" was voted into position 44.

Reception 
In an interview after the release of their fourth album, Suffa revealed that The Calling was recorded on his mother's computer and the simplicity of their 'studio' is the reason why some of the music on the album is in monaural ('mono') sound.

On 26 July 2006, Obese Records announced that the album became the first Australian hip hop release to achieve a platinum certification. The album originally peaked at number 53 on the Australian Albums Chart in 2004 before re-entering the chart at number 50 in March 2012, following the release of the sixth Hilltop Hoods album, Drinking From the Sun.

DVD 
The Calling Live DVD is available on the Hoods website and includes: Live footage, Film clips, Remixes, Interviews, Outtakes and Photo Gallery.

Track listing 

Notes
The CD hidden track is playable if the album is rewound while playing Track 1
The vinyl edition released on Obese Records in 2003 has a different tracklist to other editions. It features an exclusive track "All on Me" at track 13 and excludes the final track "The Sentinel". It also moves "The Certificate" to track 17.

Charts

Weekly charts

Certifications

References

Hilltop Hoods albums
2003 albums
Obese Records albums